Perittia ravida is a moth of the family Elachistidae. It is found in Turkey and Greece.

References

Moths described in 2009
Elachistidae
Moths of Europe
Moths of Asia